Robson Alves da Silva, known as Robson, (born November 3, 1986 in Rio de Janeiro) is a Brazilian footballer who currently plays for Marília Atlético Clube.

Biography

Club career
Robson played for Brazilian clubs Flamengo and Cabofriense between 2004 and 2008.

On December 15, 2008 it was announced that Robson, and fellow Brazilian Jefferson had signed one-year deals to play for A-League club Gold Coast United.

Robson was spotted playing for a match arranged for scouts in Rio de Janeiro. He scored on his A-League debut for Gold Coast United United against Brisbane Roar in a 3–1 victory.

After an impressive debut performance against Brisbane Roar where Robson scored the third goal in the 3–1 win, he was offered a 3-year deal by Gold Coast which he also signed.

He was caught drunk driving after a night out with friends. Robson landed himself in hot water once more with Gold Coast manager Miron Bleiberg and faced being axed from Gold Coast United, after he failed to show up to a Youth League game after being dropped from the first XI soon after the loss to Adelaide United.

Honours
 Flamengo
Copa Record Rio de Futebol: 2005

References

External links
 Gold Coast United profile
  CBF profile
 

1986 births
Living people
Brazilian footballers
Brazil youth international footballers
Brazilian expatriate footballers
Brazilian expatriate sportspeople in Australia
CR Flamengo footballers
Associação Desportiva Cabofriense players
Gold Coast United FC players
Marília Atlético Clube players
Ayia Napa FC players
Cypriot First Division players
A-League Men players
Expatriate footballers in Cyprus
Expatriate soccer players in Australia
Association football defenders
Footballers from Rio de Janeiro (city)